George Irvin Bamberger (August 1, 1923 – April 4, 2004) was an American professional baseball player, pitching coach and manager. In Major League Baseball, the right-handed pitcher appeared in ten games, nine in relief, for the 1951–52 New York Giants and the 1959 Baltimore Orioles. He later spent ten seasons (1968–77) as the Orioles' pitching coach and managed the Milwaukee Brewers (1978–80; 1985–86) and New York Mets (1982–83).

Playing career
Bamberger was born and raised in Staten Island, New York City, New York. He served in the United States Army during World War II in the Mediterranean and European theaters of operations and signed with the hometown New York Giants in 1946. Bamberger reached double digits in wins during four of his first five minor league seasons; he would record ten or more victories in 15 of his 18 years as a minor league pitcher, and win 213 total games during that span (1946–63).

Bamberger made the Giants' 28-man roster at the outset of the  season. In his big-league debut on April 19, 1951, during a Patriots' Day doubleheader against the Boston Braves at Braves Field, he gave up three hits (including a home run to Sam Jethroe) and two earned runs in two innings pitched. Nine days later, he struggled again, as he surrendered a base on balls and then a two-run homer to Jackie Robinson, while recording no outs, against the Brooklyn Dodgers. Bamberger spent the rest of that season with the Triple-A Ottawa Giants of the International League.

In , Bamberger again was a member of the big-league Giants during the season's early weeks. He appeared in five more games, all as a relief pitcher, but was largely ineffective, allowing six hits, three walks, and four earned runs in four full innings of work. After June 1, he was sent to the Oakland Oaks of the top-level Pacific Coast League, where he spent the bulk of the rest of his playing career. The Oaks transferred to Vancouver, British Columbia, in 1956, and Bamberger remained with the renamed Vancouver Mounties for another seven years until the franchise moved again, to Dallas, Texas, in 1963.

In his American League debut on April 16, Bamberger was the starting pitcher against the defending World Champion New York Yankees at Memorial Stadium. He held the Yankees scoreless for five full innings, as Baltimore built a 2–0 lead. But in the sixth, he surrendered a two-run double to Norm Siebern, tying the game; and then, after the Orioles had gone ahead 3–2 in their half of the sixth, he gave up the lead in the seventh frame. He left after  innings, having allowed four earned runs on four hits, with Baltimore trailing by a run. (The Orioles eventually prevailed, 7–4, with Billy O'Dell getting the win in relief.)

After two relief appearances with the Orioles, Bamberger returned to the Pacific Coast League for the rest of his pitching career. He never recorded a decision in the Majors, and compiled a 9.42 earned run average with 25 hits and ten bases on balls allowed, and three strikeouts, over  innings.

Coaching and managerial career

Baltimore Orioles pitching coach
In 1960–63, Bamberger served as a player-coach for the Mounties and Dallas-Fort Worth Rangers while still pitching regularly (working in 135 games, 110 as a starter). Then, in 1964, he retired as a player and rejoined the Baltimore organization as its roving minor league pitching instructor. The Orioles' farm system was then among the pioneers in standardizing player instruction. With Bamberger playing a key role, it was developing a corps of young pitchers that would help the club win the 1966 World Series. He earned a promotion when general manager Harry Dalton appointed him to succeed Harry Brecheen as the Orioles' pitching coach on October 3, 1967. Bamberger took over a pitching staff that often saw young stars quickly lose their effectiveness due to sore arms. Dave McNally and Jim Palmer, two stars who recovered under Bamberger, credited a routine of regular exercises instituted by Bamberger for reversing the trend. Serving under Hank Bauer and then Earl Weaver, Bamberger would remain with the ballclub through 1977 and five American League East Division championships, three American League pennants and the 1970 World Series championship. During that decade, he produced 18 twenty-game winners, including four for the 1971 American League champions: Jim Palmer, Mike Cuellar, Dave McNally and Pat Dobson. He also would teach his famed pitch, "The Staten Island Sinker".

1978–80: Manager of "Bambi's Bombers"
Bamberger signed a two-year $120,000 contract to succeed Alex Grammas as manager of the Milwaukee Brewers on January 20, 1978. The appointment was a reunion with Dalton who had become the Brewers' new general manager two months earlier. Dalton said Bamberger “was the only man we considered” for the position. The ball club never had a winning record in the eight seasons prior to Bamberger's arrival. Stating that a major goal was instilling a winning attitude, he added, "Last year the feeling I got was that we (the Orioles) should not lose to the Milwaukee Brewers. We felt they did not care, that they felt we were going to win."

In his first managerial assignment, Bamberger led the 1978 Brewers to a 26-game turnaround. His club won 93 games and finished third behind the Yankees and Boston Red Sox in the AL East. Bamberger's influence on his pitching staff was reflected by a 30 percent decrease in walks allowed (566 vs. 398) and a 20 percent decline in home runs allowed (136 vs. 109). Team ERA dropped from 4.32 to 3.65, and both Mike Caldwell (22–9, 2.36) and Lary Sorensen (18–12, 3.21) enjoyed standout seasons. But a spike in offense would make an even larger mark on Bamberger's team. The 1978 Brewers hit 173 home runs (48 more than in 1977) and outscored their previous year's team by 165 runs, a 26 percent rise. Seven players hit double figures in home runs, and two (Larry Hisle, signed as a free agent, and Gorman Thomas) eclipsed the 30-homer mark. The Brewers became known as "Bambi's Bombers."

But in March 1980, during spring training, Bamberger was hospitalized with back and chest pains. He was diagnosed with a heart attack, underwent surgery and was sidelined until June 6. He re-took the reins from interim pilot Buck Rodgers, but did not finish the season, resigning September 7 after compiling a disappointing 47–45 win–loss record. He stepped down with a 235–180 (.566) mark for his maiden managerial job, while turning Milwaukee into a contender for the American League pennant.

1982–83: Struggles during Mets' rebuilding
The Mets had gone only 41–62 (.398) under Joe Torre during the strike-shortened  season. The 1982 Mets—still in the early stages of a rebuilding process that would produce the 1986 world championship—played at almost an identical pace (.401), led the National League in bases on balls and finished second-worst in team ERA. Then the 1983 edition started even worse. They were 16–30 (.348) on June 3 when Bamberger resigned, saying, "I've probably suffered enough."

1985–86: Second term in Milwaukee
The bright spot on the Brewers' staff was left-handed starting pitcher Teddy Higuera, who won 15 games as a rookie in 1985 and 20 more the following season. Bamberger retired for a final time September 25, 1986, at age 63, turning the Brewers over to coach Tom Trebelhorn with nine games left in the season. He finished his managerial career with a record of 458–478 (.489).

George Bamberger died on April 4, 2004, from cancer at his home in North Redington Beach, Florida. He was 80 years old.

See also

Staten Island Sports Hall of Fame

References

External links

 SABR Biography Project. Article written by Tom Hawthorn
 Baseball in Wartime
 Historic Baseball

1923 births
2004 deaths
American expatriate baseball players in Canada
Baltimore Orioles coaches
Baltimore Orioles players
Burials at Bay Pines National Cemetery
Deaths from cancer in Florida
Dallas Rangers players
Erie Sailors players
Jersey City Giants players
Major League Baseball pitchers
Major League Baseball pitching coaches
Manchester Giants players
Milwaukee Brewers managers
Navegantes del Magallanes players
American expatriate baseball players in Venezuela
New York Giants (NL) players
New York Mets managers
Oakland Oaks (baseball) players
Ottawa Giants players
People from Pinellas County, Florida
Sportspeople from Staten Island
Baseball players from New York City
United States Army personnel of World War II
Vancouver Mounties players